The second D'Alema government was the government of Italy from 22 December 1999 to 26 April 2000.

Following the exit from the majority of the United Christian Democrats led by Rocco Buttiglione and of the Union for the Republic led by Francesco Cossiga, and in order to allow The Democrats to join the government, Massimo D'Alema resigned and formed a new government. The Italian Democratic Socialists, instead, did not participate to the formation of the government and they decided to abstain in the vote of confidence to the new government.

The government stood in office for only 4 months: after the heavy defeat of The Olive Tree at the 2000 regional elections, D'Alema resigned for an "act of political sensitivity".

The task of forming a new government was entrusted to Giuliano Amato, already minister in the two D'Alema cabinets.

Party breakdown

Ministers

Ministers and other members
 Democrats of the Left (DS): Prime minister, 8 ministers and 19 undersecretaries
 Italian People’s Party (PPI): 6 ministers and 14 undersecretaries
 The Democrats (Dem): 4 ministers and 8 undersecretaries
 Union of Democrats for Europe (UDEUR): 2 minister and 5 undersecretaries
 Independents: 2 ministers and 5 undersecretaries
 Party of Italian Communists (PdCI): 2 ministers and 3 undersecretaries
 Italian Renewal (RI): 1 minister and 5 undersecretaries
 Federation of the Greens (FdV): 1 minister and 3 undersecretaries
 Valdostan Union (UV): 1 undersecretary

Composition

References

Italian governments
1999 establishments in Italy
2000 disestablishments in Italy
Cabinets established in 1999
Cabinets disestablished in 2000